Lir, stylized on album covers as LiR, are a rock band formed in the late 1980s in Dublin, Ireland.

History

The band became known during the 1990s through their live performances in Dublin. Attention from major labels in the early portion of their career led some critics to draw comparisons to U2. The band signed with U.S. label What Are Records? in 1993, which pushed for the band's success in the US through an intensive touring schedule that had the band playing in North America nine months out of the year. Lir continued on this schedule from 1993 to 1997, before conflicts with their management led to a long hiatus.

It would be 13 years before the band's next full-length release, Nest, under the independent label 1969 Records. Lir failed to secure a contract with an established record label.Their Art Teacher once said to them "Best of Music in The Luck Business" ... Sadly Luck never played its part....

A documentary on the band, directed by Shimmy Marcus and entitled "Good Cake Bad Cake: The Story of LIR" was released in 2011, but was pulled from the Dublin International Film Festival due to a legal dispute between the band and their former management.

The band still reconvenes annually to play shows in and around Dublin.

Discography

All Machines Hum in A - 1992
Magico Magico! (Velo Records - Ireland + EU only) - 1993
Magico Magico! (What Are Records? - US release) - 1994
Nest (What Are Records? - US release) - 1995
This Appeared - EP (Velo Records - Ireland + EU only) - 1995
7000 Apes 600 - EP (Velo Records - Ireland  + EU only) - 1997
I Went Down: Music from the original motion picture soundtrack (Prophecy Ent.) - 1997
06/93 Acoustic Sessions (What Are Records? - US Release) - 2006
Lir Live (1969 Records - UK only) - 2008

References

External links
 

Irish alternative rock groups
Musical groups from Dublin (city)